Henry Beauclerk Bethune (16 November 1844 – 16 April 1912) was an English first-class cricketer. He was a right-handed batsman and a slow bowler; the arm with which he bowled is unknown.

Bethune represented Hampshire in two first-class matches in 1885, which was Hampshire's final season with first-class status until the 1895 County Championship. Bethune's debut match came against Somerset. This was Bethune's only appearance during 1885.

With the loss of Hampshire's first-class status, Bethune did not represent the club until 1890, although in a non first-class capacity, making appearances against Staffordshire, Surrey, Leicestershire, Sussex, the Marylebone Cricket Club and Oxfordshire. Bethune's second stint with the club lasted until 1893.

By 1897, Hampshire had regained their first-class status. Bethune represented the county in one first-class match in the 1897 County Championship against Lancashire. This was Bethune's last first-class match, during which he took his only first-class wicket, that of Arthur Paul.

In 1899, Bethune began playing non first-class matches for the Marylebone Cricket Club, making his debut against Herefordshire. Bethune represented the club eight times up to 1901, with his final appearance for the club coming against the Netherlands.

Family
Third son of a Sussex landowner, Charles Goodwin Bethune (1810-1864), and his wife Ann Isabella Mary (1816-1904), daughter of James Eversfield and his wife Mary, daughter of Robert Hawgood Crew, he grew up on the family estate of Denne Park. Becoming an Army officer, he rose to be a major in the Hampshire Regiment. He died unmarried.

His cousin George Maximilian Bethune also played for Hampshire between 1886 and 1892.

External links
Henry Bethune at Cricinfo
Henry Bethune at CricketArchive

1844 births
1912 deaths
People from Horsham
English cricketers
Hampshire cricketers